Ngāti Whātua is a Māori iwi (tribe) of the lower Northland Peninsula of New Zealand's North Island. It comprises a confederation of four hapū (subtribes) interconnected both by ancestry and by association over time: Te Uri-o-Hau, Te Roroa, Te Taoū, and Ngāti Whātua-o-Ōrākei. The four hapū can act together or separately as independent tribes.

Ngāti Whātua's territory or rohe is traditionally expressed as, "Tāmaki ki Maunganui i te Tai Hauauru" and "Tāmaki ki Manaia i te Rawhiti". The northern boundary is expressed as, "Manaia titiro ki Whatitiri, Whatitiri titiro ki Tutamoe, Tutamoe titiro ki Maunganui". The southern boundary is expressed as, "Te awa o Tāmaki". The area runs from Tāmaki River in the south to Maunganui Bluff (at the northern end of Aranga Beach on the west coast) in the north, and to Whangarei Harbour on the east coast.

History 
Ngāti Whātua descends from the ancestor Tuputupuwhenua (also known as Tumutumuwhenua). The iwi traces its arrival in New Zealand to the Māhuhu-ki-te-rangi canoe, which landed north of the Kaipara Harbour. They also descend from ancestors who migrated from Muriwhenua in the Far North and intermarried with the tribes in Ngāti Whātua's territory. By the 16th and 17th century, Ngāti Whātua had become established around the Kaipara Harbour.

Rivalry with Ngāpuhi escalated in the early 19th century when Ngāpuhi acquired muskets. Ngāpuhi attacked Ngāti Whātua in 1807 or 1808 in the battle of Moremonui north of Dargaville - probably the occasion of the first use of firearms in Māori warfare. Ngāti Whātua overcame the Ngāpuhi warriors with hand weapons while Ngāpuhi were reloading their muskets, winning a decisive victory over the attackers. Ngāpuhi, led by Hongi Hika, exacted revenge in 1825 when they defeated Ngāti Whātua in the battle of Te Ika a Ranganui near Kaiwaka.

On 20 March 1840 in the Manukau Harbour area where Ngāti Whātua farmed, paramount chief Apihai Te Kawau signed Te Tiriti o Waitangi, the Treaty of Waitangi. Ngāti Whātua sought British protection from Ngāpuhi as well as a reciprocal relationship with the Crown and the Church. Soon after signing the Treaty, Te Kawau offered land on the Waitematā Harbour to William Hobson, the new Governor of New Zealand, for his new capital.

Ngāti Whātua came to national prominence in the 1970s in a dispute over vacant land at Bastion Point, a little way east of the Auckland city centre, adjoining the suburb of Ōrākei. The land, which the New Zealand government had acquired cheaply for public works many decades before, largely reverted to the tribe after a long occupation and passive resistance.

Governance

Te Runanga o Ngāti Whātua has a mandate, recognised by the New Zealand Government, to negotiate Treaty of Waitangi settlements for Ngāti Whatua. It is also a mandated iwi organisation under the Māori Fisheries Act, and an Iwi Aquaculture Organisation in the Māori Commercial Aquaculture Claims Settlement Act. It represents Ngāti Whatua as an iwi authority under the Resource Management Act and is a Tūhono organisation.

The Runanga is a Māori Trust Board governed by 11 trustees from 5 takiwā or districts: 1 trustee from Ōrākei, 2 from South Kaipara, 3 from Otamatea, 1 from Whangarei and 4 from Northern Wairoa. As of 2022, the co-chairpersons of the trust are Allan Pivac and Dame Rangimarie Naida Glavish DNZM. JP, the Manahautū is Alan Riwaka, and the trust is based in Whangarei.

The iwi has interest in the territory of Northland Regional Council, Auckland Council, Kaipara District Council and Whangarei District Council.

Hapū and marae

Northern Wairoa

 Ngāti Hinga hapū, based at Ahikiwi marae (Te Aranga Mai o te Whakapono wharenui), Kaihū
 Ngāti Torehina, based at Taita marae (Kia Mahara Koutou wharenui), Māmaranui
 Unidentified hapū, based at Kāpehu marae (Tāringaroa wharenui), Mititai, and Tama te Uaua marae (Tama te Uaua wharenui), Kaihū
 Te Kuihi, based at Te Houhanga marae (Rāhiri wharenui), Dargaville
 Te Popoto, based at Ōtūrei marae (Rangimārie Te Aroha wharenui), Aratapu
 Te Roroa, based at Pananawe marae (Te Taumata o Tiopira Kinaki wharenui), Waipoua; Te Houhanga marae (Rāhiri wharenui), Dargaville; Waikarā marae (Te Uaua wharenui), Aranga; Waikaraka marae (Whakarongo wharenui), Kaihū
 Te Uri o Hau, based at: Naumai marae (Ngā Uri o te Kotahitanga wharenui), Ruawai; Ōtūrei marae (Rangimārie Te Aroha wharenui), Aratapu; Rīpia marae (No wharenui), Rīpia, and Pouto; Waikaretu marae, Matakohe; Parirau Marae-Wharemarama (Te Uri-o-Hau).

Whangarei

The Whangarei district has four hapū (sub-tribes):
 Patuharakeke hapū, based at Takahiwai marae (Rangiora wharenui), Takahiwai
 Te Kuihi hapū, based at Tangiterōria marae (Tirarau wharenui), Tangiterōria
 Te Parawhau hapū, based at Korokota marae (Tikitiki o Rangi wharenui), Tītoki and Tangiterōria marae (Tirarau wharenui), Tangiterōria
 Te Uriroroi hapū, based at Toetoe marae (Toetoe wharenui), Ōtaika

Ōrākei 

 Ngā Oho, based at Ōrākei marae (with Tumutumuwhenua wharenui), Ōrākei
 Te Taoū, based at Ōrākei marae (with Tumutumuwhenua wharenui), Ōrākei
 Te Uri Ngutu, based at Ōrākei marae (with Tumutumuwhenua wharenui), Ōrākei

Radio station
Ake 1179 is the official radio station of Ngāti Whātua, but is not officially part of the iwi radio network.

Notable people

 Dame Naida Glavish, politician and community leader
 Joe Hawke, politician and businessman
 Josh Hohneck, rugby union player
 Erana James, actress
 Hugh Kāwharu, chief and academic
 Merata Kawharu, writer and academic
 Graham Latimer, former Māori Council president
 Manos Nathan, ceramicist
 Paraire Karaka Paikea, politician and church minister
 Otene Paora, Māori leader and land negotiator
 Tame Te Rangi, civil servant and sports commentator
 Ngapipi Reweti, land negotiator
 Āpihai Te Kawau, tribal leader
 Pāora Tūhaere, tribal leader
 Diane Prince, artist, weaver and set designer
 Sir William Richard Wright, treaty negotiator and member of the New Zealand Order of Merit

References

External links
Te Rūnanga o Ngāti Whātua
Ngāti Whātua, Te Ara – the Encyclopedia of New Zealand
Orakei resource kit, Waitangi Tribunal